Ménilmontant is a neighborhood of Paris, France.

Ménilmontant may also refer to

 Ménilmontant (Paris Métro), a subway station
 Ménilmontant (1926 film), a silent film by Dimitri Kirsanoff
 Ménilmontant (1936 film), a French film
 "Ménilmontant", a 1938 song by Charles Trenet, covered by Patrick Bruel